Margaret Smith is an American six-time Emmy Award-winning standup comic, actress, writer, and producer. Originally from Chicago, Illinois, Smith is known for her deadpan and often acerbic delivery, reminiscent of Eve Arden. She was a writer and producer for The Ellen DeGeneres Show. Smith lives in Austin, Texas with her two sons.

Personal life

Early life 
The second youngest of six children, Smith was born in Chicago, Illinois in 1956 and grew up there for several years before her family relocated to Florida; there she was raised by her mother and step father. Smith has been very open about growing up in a "dysfunctional family", often using this as the basis for material in her stand-up comedy.

Adult life 
Smith currently lives in Austin, Texas with her two sons. She has written at length about her unsuccessful attempts with in vitro fertilization for several years before turning to adoption. The story of her becoming a mother is what inspired her first publication: an autobiography on the subject of her childhood with her mother and subsequently becoming a mother herself.

Smith has also been quite open about her experiences with and support of attending therapy, once again in the form of material for her stand-up and book.

Career

Stand-up comedy 
Studying improvisational comedy at Second City in Chicago during the late 1970's, it was after a move to New York City that she found there was no market for improv. Smith began performing stand up during the early 1980's in New York as a result of this. Initial stage fright almost ended her career before it began, and the rock bottom of the worst comedy clubs in the city was only a preface to the struggle she'd face in standup that decade: "It was hard enough for [the audience] to accept a woman stand-up," remarked Smith, to the Daily Herald in May 1999. Her biggest break came in 1984 when she was invited to perform on Late Night with David Letterman; she would eventually be invited back an additional six times. Her performances took her onto the screen for small movie roles, and even a position opening for George Carlin on tour. Despite these successes she was still described in papers as an "up and coming comedian" as late as 1988. Her performances into the early 1990's would be given a great deal more weight as she could at that time be billed as a nominee for Comedian of the Year from the American Comedy Awards.

She has toured the comedy circuit doing live performances throughout the United States and appeared in Amsterdam, Australia, Ireland and the Queen's Theater in London. She appeared twice at Montreal's Just For Laughs Festival.

Smith has produced and starred in her own independent projects, including her CD, As It Should Be. Released August 2000, it carries a liner note endorsement from Jay Leno: "The best comedians are the ones that write and perform their own material, and Margaret Smith is at the top of that list".

Television and film appearances 
She played Margaret the record store owner in That '80s Show. Her television and film credits include roles in Martin Scorsese's Goodfellas, the remake of The Blob, and the Wachowskis' thriller Bound with Gina Gershon and Jennifer Tilly. She made a guest-star appearance in the Pamela Anderson series, VIP.

Smith starred in a special for Comedy Central. Her other television credits include  appearances on CNN, PBS, HBO, Fox Network, Showtime, E! Network, VH-1, and Comedy Central. Smith appeared on The Tonight Show with Jay Leno, as well as Late Night with David Letterman.

Style 
Smith is most widely known for her frowning deadpan delivery and low energy performances. Despite this being somewhat of a trademark of her performances it did not resonate with every newspaper critic in the country, remarking frequently that she seemed bored.

Smith tackled humor from hating her parents, to a serial divorcee sister, and even her experience in therapy. Her family would make up the bulk of her stand up routines for many years, remarking mostly on her family's lingering effect  keeping her in aforementioned therapy. Her mother would feature most frequently and is attributed by Smith the quote "If you can't say anything nice, become a comedian", advice Smith would take. Despite this, she always maintained that her comedy would not become mean-spirited, ensuring that she took a stance to never "gay-bash or woman-bash", in her own words, and would become confrontational with her opening acts if they crossed this line.

Publications 
Her first book, What Was I Thinking? How Being a Stand Up Did Nothing to Prepare Me to Become a Single Mother, was published in 2008 by Crossroad Publishing. A reviewer at Book Apex commented:
What Sedaris, Lebowitz and Dave Eggers should aspire to. Margaret Smith is a one-of-a-kind comedian. Her off-kilter worldview and dry-as-dust delivery is fresh and real in a world of grinning comedy clones. My favorite Margaret Smith-ism goes something like "I saw my mother today. (long pause) It's okay, she didn't see me." I'm not always able to catch her on tv like I used to, so I was delighted to hear she'd written a book. The cover says the book's about becoming a mother, but you won't find overly sweet sentimentality here. Smith makes looking on the dark side into an art form. Her story is dark and horrific, and she pulls no punches when writing about violence, abuse, racism, tomatoes and her calling plan. Only Margaret Smith could make comedy of this. But she pulls it off astonishingly well—deftly balancing tragedy and humor. Ultimately, it's not a story about adopting a baby, it's a heartfelt tale of spiritual redemption. I know that doesn't sound very funny, but it really is.

Filmography

Awards

References

External links
 Margaret Smith video clips (1992-2004)
 

American television actresses
American humorists
American stand-up comedians
Living people
Actresses from Chicago
Place of birth missing (living people)
American women comedians
Writers from Chicago
American television writers
American women television writers
American film actresses
21st-century American actresses
21st-century American women writers
Women humorists
Comedians from Illinois
21st-century American comedians
Screenwriters from Illinois
21st-century American screenwriters
1956 births